Tentyriini is a tribe of darkling beetles in the subfamily Pimeliinae of the family Tenebrionidae. There are more than 90 genera in Tentyriini.

Genera
These genera belong to the tribe Tentyriini

 Abigopsis Escalera, 1914  (the Palearctic)
 Afrinus Fairmaire, 1888  (tropical Africa)
 Alcinoeta Strand, 1929  (the Palearctic)
 Amblycarenum Gebien, 1910  (the Palearctic)
 Ammogiton Peyerimhoff, 1920  (the Palearctic)
  Eschscholtz, 1831  (the Palearctic)
 Aphrotus Péringuey, 1904  (tropical Africa)
 Archinamibia Koch, 1952  (tropical Africa)
 Asphaltesthes Kraatz, 1865  (tropical Africa)
 Broomium Koch, 1950  (tropical Africa)
 Calyptopsis Solier, 1835  (the Palearctic)
 Cantopipleurus Koch, 1943  (tropical Africa)
 Capnisiceps Chatanay, 1914  (tropical Africa)
 Catomulus Reitter, 1897  (the Palearctic)
 Cimipsa Peyerimhoff, 1911  (the Palearctic)
 Colposcelis Dejean, 1834  (the Palearctic)
 Colposphena Semenov, 1889  (the Palearctic)
 Craniosphena Koch, 1962  (tropical Africa)
 Cychrachna Koch, 1950  (tropical Africa)
 Cyphostethe Marseul, 1867  (the Palearctic and tropical Africa)
 Dailognatha Steven, 1828  (the Palearctic)
 Dengitha Reitter, 1887  (the Palearctic)
 Derosphaerius Westwood, 1881  (tropical Africa)
 Dichomma Solier, 1835  (the Palearctic)
 Dividiopsa Koch, 1944  (tropical Africa)
 Epitrichia Gebler, 1859  (the Palearctic)
 Eschatostena Keleinikova, 1977  (the Palearctic)
 Eulipus Wollaston, 1864  (the Palearctic)
 Eusyntelia C.O. Waterhouse, 1881  (tropical Africa)
 Falsocatomulus Pic, 1914  (the Palearctic)
 Freudeia Kaszab, 1961  (Indomalaya)
 Freyitia Koch, 1943  (Indomalaya)
 Girardius L. Soldati, 2009  (the Palearctic)
 Gnathosia Fischer von Waldheim, 1821  (the Palearctic)
 Gnophota Erichson, 1843  (tropical Africa)
 Hegeter Latreille, 1802  (the Palearctic and tropical Africa)
 Hegeterocara Reitter, 1900  (the Palearctic)
 Herlesa Reitter, 1897  (the Palearctic)
 Hionthis Miller, 1861  (the Palearctic)
 Homala Eschscholtz, 1831  (tropical Africa)
 Homalinota Koch, 1950  (tropical Africa)
 Homoeonota Fairmaire, 1882  (the Palearctic and tropical Africa)
 Hyonthosoma Reitter, 1900  (the Palearctic)
 Hyperops Eschscholtz, 1831  (the Palearctic, tropical Africa, and Indomalaya)
 Hypsosoma Ménétriés, 1854  (the Palearctic)
 Imatismus Dejean, 1834  (the Palearctic, tropical Africa, and Indomalaya)
 Kokeniella Reitter, 1906  (Indomalaya)
 Leptosphena Semenov, 1891  (the Palearctic)
 Megagenius Solier, 1835  (the Palearctic)
 Melanochrus Wollaston, 1864  (the Palearctic)
 Melaxumia Reitter, 1895  (the Palearctic)
 Mesostena Eschscholtz, 1831  (the Palearctic and tropical Africa)
 Micipsa P.H. Lucas, 1855  (the Palearctic and tropical Africa)
 Microdera Eschscholtz, 1831  (the Palearctic)
 Microderopsis Haag-Rutenberg, 1876  (tropical Africa)
 Namaquaeon Koch, 1950  (tropical Africa)
 Namibismus Koch, 1952  (tropical Africa)
 Neognathosia Kaszab, 1959  (the Palearctic)
 Nerinodon Koch, 1952  (tropical Africa)
 Nothrocerus Fairmaire, 1887  (tropical Africa)
 Orostegastopsis Koch, 1962  (tropical Africa)
 Oterophloeus Desbrochers des Loges, 1881  (the Palearctic)
 Oxycara Solier, 1835  (the Palearctic, tropical Africa, and Indomalaya)
 Oxycarops Reitter, 1900  (the Palearctic)
 Pachychila Eschscholtz, 1831  (the Palearctic)
 Paivaea Wollaston, 1864  (the Palearctic)
 Parabigopsis Español, 1946  (the Palearctic)
 Paracirta Schuster, 1930  (the Palearctic)
 Paulianesthes Koch, 1962  (tropical Africa)
 Phaeotribon Kraatz, 1865  (the Palearctic and tropical Africa)
 Prochoma Solier, 1835  (the Palearctic and Indomalaya)
 Psammocryptus Kraatz, 1865  (the Palearctic)
 Psammoica Solier, 1835  (the Palearctic)
 Rhammatodes Haag-Rutenberg, 1876  (tropical Africa)
 Rhomaleus Chatanay, 1915  (the Palearctic and tropical Africa)
 Rhytinota Eschscholtz, 1831  (tropical Africa and Indomalaya)
 Rozonia Fairmaire, 1888  (tropical Africa)
 Scelosodis Solier, 1835  (the Palearctic)
 Schweinfurthia Andres, 1922  (the Palearctic and tropical Africa)
 Scythis Kraatz, 1865  (the Palearctic)
 Scytosoma Reitter, 1895  (the Palearctic)
 Sinoecia Chatanay, 1914  (the Palearctic)
 Sphenaria Ménétriés, 1849  (the Palearctic)
 Stegastopsis Kraatz, 1865  (the Palearctic)
 Stenosida Solier, 1835  (Indomalaya and Australasia)
 Syachis Bates, 1879  (the Palearctic)
 Tamena Reitter, 1900  (the Palearctic)
 Tentyria Latreille, 1802  (the Palearctic)
 Tentyrina Reitter, 1900  (the Palearctic and tropical Africa)
 Tentyronota Reitter, 1900  (the Palearctic)
 Thalpobia Fairmaire, 1871  (the Palearctic)
 Thalpophilodes Strand, 1942  (tropical Africa)
 Thraustocolus Kraatz, 1866  (the Palearctic and tropical Africa)
 Trichosphaena Reitter, 1916  (the Palearctic and tropical Africa)
 Uyttenboogaartia Koch, 1943  (the Palearctic)

References

Further reading

 
 

Tenebrionoidea